Komputer Muzik is the debut studio album from Malaysian singer Francissca Peter released in 1984. In September 2010, Warner Music Malaysia re-issued the CD due to popular demand.

Track listing

Credits and personnel
Credits adapted from Komputer Muzik booklet liner notes.

 Arrangements by Spectrum, William De Cruz
 Recorded by – Wong Chee Seong

Personnel
Keyboards – Micheal Veerapen
Drums – Maniam, Louis Pragasam (track 7)
Bass – David Yee
Guitars – Joseph Thomas
Tenor Sax, Flute – Salvado A Gurzo
Oberheim DMX was used on tracks 3, 4, 5, 6, and 8

References

External links 
Official Francissca Peter Website

Francissca Peter on SoundCloud

1984 albums
Francissca Peter albums
Warner Music Group albums
Malay-language albums